S.P.U.K. (Long title: Sreća Pojedinca - Uspjeh Kolektiva ) is a 1983 Serbo-Croatian language Yugoslavian comedy film written by Hrvoje Hitrec and directed by Milivoj Puhlovski.

Plot
The Government's Sava Commander wants his youth labor brigade to be the best, but this goal seems difficult to reach when he sees graffiti being repeated all over his area of command. The Commander begins to hunt for the graffiti makers, but they are difficult to find and stop.

Cast

 Damir Šaban as Lovro
 Cintija Ašperger as Vlasta
 Danko Ljuština as Vlado
 Zvonimir Jurić as Kuhar
 Radoslav Spitzmuller as Boro
 Elizabeta Kukić as Koka
 Branimir Vidić as Mrva
 Predrag 'Pređo' Vušović as Redford
 Vili Matula as Ninđa
 Pjer Zardin as Clapton
 Mario Mirković as Mišo
 Anja Šovagović-Despot as Bolničarka
 Ivanišević Nedeljko as Bilder
 Tanja Mazele as Zita
 Borivoj Zimonja as Radio-voditelj
 Tomislav Lipljin as Liječnik
 Milan Plećaš as Sekretar
 Otokar Levaj as Ličilac
 Slavica Knežević as Seksolog
 Đuro Utješanović as Dermatolog
 Mladen Crnobrnja as Sociolog
 Đuro Crnobrnja as Kino-operator
 Zdenka Trach as Teta
 Željko Haberstok as Ribić
 Željka Galler as Redfordova djevojka
 Emira Filipović as Zvjezdana
 Mehdi Jashari as Medo / Dobrovoljac
 Ranko Vujisić as Recitator
 Zlatko Rado as Dežurni
 Mirko Sušić as Pomoćnik
 Vlasta Klemenc as Miss
 Slobodanka Burcel as Boba

Reception
The film was shot in an era when once very popular youth work actions were waning in Yugoslavia, and its exploitation formula of youth comedy mixed with eroticism was unsuccessful with the critics and the cinemagoers alike.

References

External links
 

1983 films
Croatian comedy films
1980s Croatian-language films
Yugoslav comedy films
Zagreb Film films
Films set in Yugoslavia